Something Like a War is an Indian documentary by Deepa Dhanraj made in 1991.  It examines India's family planning program revolved on the gender it primarily affects: women.

Synopsis 
While examining India's family planning or population control programs, it also focuses on the coerced sterilizations (done by tubal ligation) of women in India and on the opinions of Indian women of these programs and the traditional family life of Indian women.

The film documents the state of reproductive rights for women in India that juxtaposes the detachment of science next to a new form of oppression for women. Something like a War is a film about reproductive rights, especially women's reproductive rights, in India. The film includes footage of a group of women discussing their sexuality and motherhood.

The discussions between these women emphasise the challenges women face to be valued for more than their reproductive role. One woman states that they (women) are valued only for their womb, and only if their womb produces a boy. Women in India are objectified by their sexuality and ability to reproduce.

This often forces women to hide their sexuality. Once women are able to reproduce they are married off and expected to have children, often at a very young age. While there is pressure from families to have children, the government also exerts pressure to limit the reproduction of low-income, Dalit and Muslim women. This often forces women to feel ashamed and hide their menstruation. One scene shows a woman describing her first time menstruating, stating that a friend told her to hide this, to do so she should shove sand between her legs.

Producer 
Deepa Dhanraj is a world renowned filmmaker that has been involved with the women's rights movement since 1980. She founded Yugantar, a Bangalore-based film collective that mainly focuses on producing films about women's labor and domestic conditions in the southern parts of India.

With over three decades of experience with filmography she has produced award-winning films such as Enough of this Silence (2008), and The Advocate (2007).  Her film Something Like a War depicts gender and class violence of the population control policies enforced by the Indian government.

References

External links
 

1991 films
Sterilization (medicine)
Documentary films about women in India
Family planning in India